St. Tammany Regional Airport  is a public use airport in St. Tammany Parish, Louisiana, United States. It is owned by St. Tammany Parish and located six nautical miles (11 km) southeast of the central business district of Covington, Louisiana.  The nearest town is Abita Springs.

Facilities and aircraft 
It has one runway designated 18/36 with an asphalt surface measuring 2,999 by 75 feet (914 x 23 m).

For the 12-month period ending April 15, 2009, the airport had 25,600 aircraft operations, an average of 70 per day: 98% general aviation and 2% air taxi and <1% military. At that time there were 18 aircraft based at this airport: 13 single-engine, 3 multi-engine, 1 helicopter and 1 ultralight.

See also 
 Slidell Airport, also located in St. Tammany Parish, owned by the City of Slidell

References

External links 

 Air Reldan, Inc., the fixed-base operator (FBO)
 Aerial photo as of 24 January 1998 from USGS The National Map via MSR Maps
 

Airports in Louisiana
Buildings and structures in St. Tammany Parish, Louisiana
Transportation in St. Tammany Parish, Louisiana
Transportation in the New Orleans metropolitan area
Airports in the New Orleans metropolitan area